Paul Dedrick Gray (April 8, 1972 – May 24, 2010), also known as the Pig, was an American musician. He was the bassist, backing vocalist, main songwriter and one of the founding members of the heavy metal band Slipknot, in which he was designated #2.

Early life and career 
Paul Dedrick Gray was born in Los Angeles, California. Later his family relocated to Des Moines, Iowa. He played guitar but switched to bass after he relocated to Iowa. In his youth, Gray performed in bands such as Sudden Infant Death Syndrome, Anal Blast, Vexx, Body Pit, The Have Nots and Inveigh Catharsis.

At the time of his death, he was one of three original members of Slipknot remaining in the band, and the only one who had maintained his original role in the band due to Clown's switch from main drums to percussion during the early days. He was one of the two members not born in Iowa (the other is Jim Root, who was born in Las Vegas). In 2010, Slipknot released the Download 2009 performance on DVD in memory of Gray.

Besides Slipknot, Gray filled in as bassist for Unida during their 2003 tour, appeared on the album Worse Than a Fairy Tale by the band Drop Dead, Gorgeous, toured briefly with Reggie and the Full Effect and appeared on the Roadrunner United project, performing bass on "The Enemy" and "Baptized in the Redemption" from the project's album The All-Star Sessions.

An award was named after Paul titled "Paul Gray: Best Bassist of the Year", as a tribute to Paul. Slipknot presented the award to Nikki Sixx, of Mötley Crüe and Sixx A.M.

Death 
On May 24, 2010, The Des Moines Register reported that Gray had been found dead in room 431 at the TownePlace Suites Hotel in Urbandale, Iowa at about 10:50 a.m. local time. In a 911-call, obtained by TMZ, one of the hotel's proprietors said that a hypodermic needle was found next to Gray's bed, as well as many pills that were apparently scattered across the room. An initial autopsy determined that no foul play or trauma was involved, but could not establish the cause of death.

On June 21, 2010, the autopsy results showed that Gray had died of an overdose of morphine and fentanyl, and that he had also developed "significant heart disease". The autopsy also revealed traces of the anti-anxiety pill Xanax in his system.

Aftermath 
On the day after Gray's death, May 25, 2010, the band, without their usual masks, held a formal press conference in Des Moines, Iowa. They did not take any questions from the media. The band, as well as Gray's brother, Tony, and wife, Brenna, paid tribute to him.

A private funeral was held on May 28, 2010. Paul Gray was buried at the Highland Memory Gardens Cemetery in Des Moines, Iowa. On November 8, 2010, items that decorated Gray's grave, including a Buddha statue and gargoyle statue, were stolen. The band responded to this event with a post on their Myspace and Facebook page, asking the robbers to return the stolen items and appealing for information from the public.

On July 30, Paul Gray was posthumously awarded the Kerrang! "Services to Metal" award, which was collected by his Slipknot bandmate Corey Taylor on his behalf.

Slipknot's former guitarist Donnie Steele filled in on bass guitar for Gray on Slipknot's 2011 Summer tour. Slipknot shows during this time featured Paul's jumpsuit and self-titled album era pig mask on a stand, along with a bass guitar standing next to it. Fans honored Gray with a two-minute silence during the band's headline set at Sonisphere Festival, Knebworth.

Corey Taylor also got a tattoo of Gray and his number on the back of his left leg, which was documented in the television series NY Ink, during the second episode of season one.

Trial against physician 
In September 2012, Gray's physician Daniel Baldi was charged with involuntary manslaughter relating to Gray's death, as well as the deaths of at least seven others. He was accused of continually writing high-dose prescription narcotics to Gray from December 27, 2005 until his death, despite knowing Gray's history of drug addiction and abuse. The doctor appeared in court on September 27, 2012 to face the charges, to which he pleaded not guilty. On May 1, 2014, jurors found Daniel Baldi not guilty on all seven counts of involuntary manslaughter following two days of deliberation. Gray's wife Brenna had testified during the two-week-long trial that Baldi prescribed the anti-anxiety drug Xanax to her husband, despite knowing he was addicted to the prescription medicine.

In January 2018, the family received an out of court settlement from a civil lawsuit they had filed against Dr. Daniel Baldi and his former employers. Two months later, the Iowa Board of Pharmacy permanently banned Baldi from being able to prescribe, administer, or dispense controlled substances for the treatment of chronic pain.

Discography

with Vex 

 Shadow of Reality (1991)

with Anal Blast 

 Demo Tape (1991)
 Pussy Blood Pentagram (1994)

with Inveigh Catharsis 

 Inveigh Catharsis (1992)

with Body Pit 

 Basement Demo (1994)

With the Have Nots 

 Forgetting Yesterday and Beating You With Kindness (1996)

with Slipknot

Studio albums 

 Slipknot (1999)
 Iowa (2001)
 Vol. 3: (The Subliminal Verses) (2004)
 All Hope Is Gone (2008)

Other media 

 Mate. Feed. Kill. Repeat (1996 demo album)
 Welcome to Our Neighborhood (1999 video album)
 Disasterpieces (2002 video album)
 9.0: Live (2005 live album)
 Voliminal: Inside the Nine (2006 live album)
 Nine: The Making of "All Hope Is Gone" (2008)
 Behind the Player: Paul Gray (2008)
 Of the (sic): Your Nightmares, Our Dreams (2009)
 (sic)nesses (2010 video album)
 Antennas to Hell (compilation album 2012)

Guest appearances 

 The All-Star Sessions (Roadrunner United) (2005)
 Worse Than a Fairy Tale (Drop Dead, Gorgeous) (2007)
 The Concert (Roadrunner United) (2008)
 Last Stop: Crappy Town (Reggie and the Full Effect) (2008)
 Sid (posthumous) (2011)

Filmography 
 2002: Rollerball

References

External links 

 Official Slipknot website

1972 births
2010 deaths
Alternative metal bass guitarists
American heavy metal bass guitarists
American male bass guitarists
Drug-related deaths in Iowa
Grammy Award winners
Guitarists from Los Angeles
Kerrang! Awards winners
Roadrunner Records artists
Slipknot (band) members
Reggie and the Full Effect members
20th-century American bass guitarists